Children Shouldn't Play with Dead Things (also known as Revenge of the Living Dead, Things from the Dead, and Zreaks) is a 1972 comedic horror film directed by Bob Clark. It later became a cult classic. This low-budget zombie film is the third film of director Bob Clark, who later became famous for directing the films Black Christmas, A Christmas Story, and Porky's.
The film was shot in 14 days on a budget of $50,000. Clark employed some of his college friends on it.

Plot
The story focuses on a theatre troupe who travel by boat to a small island off the coast of  Miami that is mainly used as a cemetery for deranged criminals, to have a night of fun and games. Their director Alan (Alan Ormsby), a twisted, sadistic individual, tells his group — whom he refers as his "children" — numerous stories relating to the island's history and buried inhabitants. He leads them to a cottage, where they are supposed to spend the night. He then opens a chest they have brought with him, puts on a mystical robe and prepares them for a summation at midnight, with threats of firing them if they do not do as he pleases. At midnight, using a grimoire, Alan begins a ritual to raise the dead after digging up the body of a man named Orville Dunworth (Seth Sklarey). Though the original intent of the ritual may have been just a joke, Alan appears disappointed that nothing happens.

The party continues, and Alan goes to extremes to degrade the actors, using Orville's corpse for his own sick jokes. Then, however, animated by the fell ritual, the dead return to life and force the troupe to take refuge in the old house. Trapped, they conduct a plan to lure the zombies to the front of the house whilst one of the group, Paul, runs out the back to go get help. The plan doesn't work, as Paul is ambushed by a zombie and devoured.

In a last ditch effort, the group attempts to read another spell from the book of the dead to return the zombies to their graves. It appears to work as the zombies begin to dissipate into the forest. However, they fail to abide by the rule of returning Orville's corpse to his grave, leading the zombies to re-emerge and ambush the group as they leave the house. Two members of the group, Jeff and Val are killed, whilst Alan and Anya retreat back to the house. Despite barricading the door, the zombies burst through, pursuing them up the stairs. In an effort to save himself, Alan throws Anya to the zombies; but the zombies continue to focus their attention on Alan and chase him up the stairs. Alan locks himself in the bedroom where he left Orville's corpse, but now finds Orville animated into unlife too. Orville attacks and brings down Alan, followed by the rest of the zombies crashing through the door.

In the movie's closing credits, the zombies board Alan's boat as the lights of Miami shine in the background.

Cast

 Alan Ormsby as Alan
 Valerie Mamches as Val
 Jeff Gillen as Jeff
 Anya Ormsby as Anya
 Paul Cronin as Paul
 Jane Daly as Terry
 Roy Engleman as Roy
 Robert Philip as Emerson
 Bruce Solomon as Winns
 Alecs Baird as Caretaker
 Seth Sklarey as Orville Dunworth

Production

Reception

Encyclopedia of Horror concludes that given the budget and the number of personnel involved, the special effects by Alan Ormsby are "surprisingly effective".

In his book Zombiemania: 80 Movies to Die For, author Arnold T. Blumberg observed that "the end is ... pretty creepy, with the credits running silently over the strangely surreal shot of the zombies preparing a sailboat for launching," adding that the film conjures "an atmosphere of inevitability and hopelessness. But then again, Ormsby managed that before the first dead body clawed its way out of the ground."

"Children Shouldn't Play With Dead Things", a track on Finnish heavy/doom metal band Wolfshead's 2017 album Leaden, is based on the movie.

, the film holds a score of 42% on Rotten Tomatoes, based on 12 reviews, with an average rating of 5.2/10.

Home media

Although previously available on VHS, a special edition DVD was released in 2007 by VCI Entertainment. It features the uncut version of the film, a photo gallery, and a cast commentary. The same content was briefly made available on VHS through Anchor Bay Entertainment.

On February 23, 2016, VCI released the film on blu-ray.

Proposed remake
Director Bob Clark was planning a remake before his death in 2007. In November 2010, Gravesend Film Enterprises confirmed it would produce a remake, set to begin filming in Spring 2011, although this never came to pass.

See also
 List of American films of 1972

References

External links

Movie Tome listing
Children Shouldn't Play With Dead Things at Rotten Tomatoes

1972 films
1972 comedy films
1972 horror films
1970s American films
1970s comedy horror films
1970s English-language films
1970s supernatural films
American comedy horror films
American exploitation films
American splatter films
American supernatural horror films
American zombie comedy films
American zombie films
Films about actors
Films directed by Bob Clark
Films set in Florida
Films set on islands